Paattukku Oru Thalaivan is a 1989 Tamil language romantic drama film, directed by Liaquat Ali Khan. The film stars Vijayakanth and Shobana . It was one of the blockbuster hits of year.

Plot 
The movie starts with Arivu fighting against some goons, where he meets Shanthi. He gets drunk and is confronted by his mother Shenbagam. When his best friend Vicky asks about his past, his mother tells his story.

In the flashback, Arivu is an innocent son of Veluchami, who is an atheist. Their family has troubles with local  M.L.A Marudhanayagam. Arivu falls in love with his daughter Shanthi, who comes to the village for vacation. When Veluchami goes to Marudhanayagam's house with the alliance he is embarrassed by them, Shanthi also denies that she never loved his son. He dies in shock and Arivu is moved to Chennai. He became a drunkard to forget Shanthi.

Shanthi tries to convince Arivu that she is not guilty, but he never gives her a chance. Shenbagam meets with an accident and Shanthi saves her life by donating blood and even paying her hospital bills. Shanthi tells the truth to Shenbagam that she lied that day to save the life of Veluchami, who was surrounded by her fathers gunmen unknown to them. She tried to tell the truth and run away, but was caught and locked up in a room by her father.

Arivu, still not convinced, hates Shanthi. He learns the truth from his mother and also come to know that Shanthi's marriage has been fixed. Shanthi tries to commit suicide and is saved by Arivu.

Cast 

Vijayakanth as Arivu
Shobana as Shanthi
M. N. Nambiar as Veluchami, Arivu's father
K. R. Vijaya as Shenbagam, Arivu's mother
Vijayakumar as M.L.A Marudhanayagam
Livingston
S. S. Chandran as  Singaram
Janagaraj as Vicky
Senthil as Azhagu
Kovai Sarala as Selvi

Songs

References

External links 

1989 films
1980s Tamil-language films
Films scored by Ilaiyaraaja